"My Secret (Didja Gitit Yet?)" is a 1985 song by R&B/pop group New Edition, released as the fourth and final single from their eponymous second album. Ralph Tresvant sings lead.

Video and film
The music video for "My Secret (Didja Gitit Yet?)" was the first to use live-action from the NBA, which included appearances by various Los Angeles Lakers players, most notably Magic Johnson.
New Edition made a cameo appearance in the 1985 film Krush Groove, in which they perform "My Secret (Didja Gitit Yet?)".

Charts

References

External links

1984 songs
1985 singles
New Edition songs
MCA Records singles